Ridgewater College is a public community college in Willmar and Hutchinson, Minnesota. It was founded in 1996 as part of the Minnesota State Colleges and Universities System. It was created by the consolidation of Willmar Community College (founded in 1962) and Hutchinson-Willmar Regional Technical College (itself a merger of independent Willmar and Hutchinson technical colleges). Its name refers to the rivers and lakes near the colleges and to the glacial ridge in the region.

References

External links 
Official website

Two-year colleges in the United States
Community colleges in Minnesota
Educational institutions established in 1996
1996 establishments in Minnesota
Willmar, Minnesota
Education in Kandiyohi County, Minnesota
Education in McLeod County, Minnesota